Paul Blake (1904–28 January 1960) was a British actor.

Selected filmography 
 Lazybones (1935)
 Twice Branded (1936)
 King of the Castle (1936)
 The Crimson Circle (1936)
 The Lilac Domino (1937)
 Darts Are Trumps (1938)
 Welcome, Mr. Washington (1944)
 Gaiety George (1946)
 Green Fingers (1947)
 My Brother Jonathan (1948)
 Nothing Venture (1948)
 Castle in the Air (1952)

External links

References

1904 births
1960 deaths
British male stage actors
British male film actors
20th-century British male actors